"Little Child" is a song by the English rock band the Beatles from their 1963 UK album With the Beatles. It was written by John Lennon and Paul McCartney for Ringo Starr, but Starr was instead given "I Wanna Be Your Man" as his album song.

Background
McCartney describes "Little Child" as being a "work song", or an "album filler". He admits to taking the melody of the line "I'm so sad and lonely" from the song "Whistle My Love" by British balladeer and actor Elton Hayes. The phrase "sad and lonely" also appears in the Lennon-McCartney number "Bad to Me", originally recorded by Billy J. Kramer and the Dakotas, as well as "Act Naturally", which the Beatles covered (with Starr singing) for the album Help!.

Recording
The song was recorded in three different sessions, with the first on 11 September 1963, where the Beatles recorded two takes. They later came back to it the next day, where they recorded 16 takes, including overdubs of piano from McCartney, and harmonica from Lennon which he plays nonstop throughout the song. They later returned to it on 3 October, where they recorded three more takes. In the stereo mix, the harmonica pans from left to right for the solo. Then it pans back from right to left after the solo. The song's solo follows a "twelve-bar blues format that does not appear in the rest of the [song]."

Reception
Music critic Richie Unterberger of AllMusic said of the song: "It might have been one of the less sophisticated and impressive tracks on the record, but it was still pretty good", and "'Little Child' might not be a work of genius, but it's sheer rock 'n' roll fun".

Personnel
John Lennon – vocal, rhythm guitar, harmonica
Paul McCartney – vocal, piano, bass
George Harrison – lead guitar
Ringo Starr – drums, additional drums
Personnel per Ian MacDonald

MacDonald said that the vocals were "credited to Lennon and McCartney, but more like the former double-tracked", though it is possible that McCartney sings a lower harmony to Lennon's lead during the verses, plus McCartney can be heard at the end singing "oh yeah" on his own, so the original credit is probably correct.

Cover versions
Wreckless Eric covered the song with James Nicholls for Mojo magazine's CD We're With the Beatles in 2013.
The song was also covered by the fictional band Snow Pink, on an episode of the television series CHiPs, titled "Battle of the Bands" (1982).

Notes

References

External links 
 

The Beatles songs
Song recordings produced by George Martin
1963 songs
Songs written by Lennon–McCartney
Songs published by Northern Songs